Pablo Muchnik (born 1966) is an American philosopher and  Associate Professor of Philosophy at Emerson College. 
He was the president of the North American Kant Society (2014-2017).
Muchnik is known for his works on philosophy of Immanuel Kant.

Books
 Kant's Theory of Evil: An Essay on The Dangers of Self-Love and the Aprioricity of History, Lexington Books, 2009
 Rethinking Kant (ed.), Cambridge Scholar Publishing, vol. I, 2008; vol. II, 2010
Kant's Anatomy of Evil (ed.), Cambridge University Press, 2010

References

21st-century American philosophers
Philosophy academics
Living people
Kant scholars
1966 births
The New School alumni
Emerson College faculty